Summer of the Seventeenth Doll is a 1964 British TV adaptation of the play Summer of the Seventeenth Doll by Ray Lawler. It was done for Thursday Theatre.

Cast
Lyn Ashley as Bubba Ryan
Madge Ryan as Pearl Cunningham
Sheila Hancock as Olive Leech
Ewen Solon as Barney Ibbot
Grant Taylor as Ron Webber
Hazel Coppen as Emma Leech
George Roubicek as Johnny Dowd
Anthony Coburn as Taxi driver
Valentine Ashley as Newspaper Boy

External links

Summer of the Seventeenth Doll at AustLit (subscription required)
Summer of the Seventeenth Doll at BFI

1964 films
1960s English-language films